Ge is a surname of Chinese origin. One branch of the family became the compound surname Zhuge. In 2013 it was found to be the 110th most common surname, composed of 1.95 million people or 0.150% of the total national population, with the province with the largest population being Jiangsu. It is the 44th name on the Hundred Family Surnames poem.

Notable people
 Ge Yunfei (born 1789, died 1841), Chinese General of the Qing Dynasty who served in the First Opium War
 Ge Hongsheng ( 1931–2020), Chinese politician
 Ge Tian (born 1988) Chinese actress and fashion model
 Ge Xiaoguang (born 1953), Chinese artist
 Christine Ko (born 1988) a Taiwanese-American actress
 Ko Yu-chin (born 1939), Taiwanese politician
 Ernest Shiu-Jen Kuh (1928–2015) was a Chinese-born American electrical engineer

Stagenames
 Grace Chang (born 1933), known by her stagename as Ge Lan (葛蘭), Hong Kong-Chinese actress and singer

References

Chinese-language surnames
Individual Chinese surnames